William Henry Elder (March 22, 1819 – October 31, 1904) was an American prelate of the Catholic Church. He served as bishop of the Diocese of Natchez in Mississippi from 1857 to 1880 and as archbishop of the Archdiocese of Cincinnati in Ohio between 1883 and his death.

Biography

Early life and education
William Elder was born in Baltimore, Maryland, on March 22, 1819. His father, Basil Elder, was a descendant of William Elder (1681–1714), a Catholic immigrant from England to Maryland (United States) in colonial times. His grandfather was Thomas Elder, husband of Elizabeth Spalding, thus making William a first cousin once removed of Catherine Spalding, co-founder of the Sisters of Charity of Nazareth. His mother was Elisabeth Miles (née Snowden) Elder.

In 1831 Elder entered Mount St. Mary's College, in Emmitsburg, Maryland. Elder graduated in 1837 and entered the seminary. In 1842, he was sent to the Pontifical Urban College in Rome, where he received the degree of Doctor of Divinity. Elder was ordained a priest in Rome on March 29, 1846. He became professor at the seminary at Emmitsburg, Maryland.

Bishop of Natchez

Elder was appointed on January 9, 1857, by Pope Pius IX to succeed James Oliver Van de Velde as bishop of the Diocese of Natchez. He was consecrated in the cathedral of Baltimore by Archbishop Francis Kenrick on May 3, 1857. The diocese comprised the entire state of Mississippi. 

On the eve of the American Civil War, Elder wrote to his father: It is hard to tell what is to be the fate of the country. I have not enough of political sagacity to see what will be the course of events, nor what would be the fruit of the remedies proposed. . . . We can all unite in praying to God to guide and protect us.

Elder celebrated Mass for the wounded and ministered to soldiers and freedmen gathered in Natchez. He sent priests to serve as chaplains in the Confederate States Army and Sisters of Mercy to nurse the sick and wounded, and he gave his blessing to a Natchez volunteer company.

During the Union occupation of Natchez, Elder caused some controversy for refusing to obey an order to have prayers for the President of the United States recited publicly in the churches of his diocese. On June 18, 1864, Colonel B.G. Farrar, commander at Natchez, and former schoolmate of Elder's at Mt. St. Mary's, issued an order requiring the clergy to include prayers for the President of the United States in their services, as a "public recognition of allegiance under which they live, and to which they are indebted for protection..."  Elder responded with a lengthy letter of protest in which he explained that his declining to submit had no political significance, but the "Liberty of the Church to discharge her divine functions, without interference form other persons." Brigadier General James Tuttle issued an order for enforcement, which was stayed at Elder's request, pending input from the War Department.Elder wrote to President Abraham Lincoln explaining that his refusal was based on the authority of the church to regulate church services. Senator Francis Kernan responded, saying he had met with Secretary of War Edwin M. Stanton and Stanton indicated that he would communicate to Tuttle to remedy the situation so there would be no further interference. Elder subsequently wrote thanking Stanton for the protection extended to religious freedom, and asking that the ruling be made known to other commanders.

When Colonel Farrar was placed in command of Natchez, he noted Tuttle's order had neither been rescinded nor was being obeyed. General Mason Brayman, the next commander, took a harder stance, saying "...military orders are to be followed, not discussed..." and issued an order for Elder to be sent to jail in Vidalia, Louisiana. Federal troops took Elder to Vidalia for a few weeks.  After Washington officials intervened, Brayman ordered the release of Elder on August 12, 1864.

During his time in Natchez, a yellow fever epidemic broke out in 1878. Ministering to the sick, Elder caught the disease. He survived but lost six diocesan priests. At the time he arrived in Natchez the diocese had eleven missions (churches), nine priests and 10,000 Catholics. When he left, there were forty-one churches, 25 priests, six religious houses for men, five convents, thirteen parish schools and 12,500 Catholics.

Archbishop of Cincinnati
On January 30, 1880, Elder was appointed coadjutor archbishop with the right of succession, to Archbishop John Purcell, for the Archdiocese of Cincinnati.  Elder automatically succeeded on July 4, 1883. He became archbishop at a time of great financial difficulty in the archdiocese. Elder systematically organized the administration of the diocese. He reopened Mount Saint Mary Seminary in 1887, which had been closed since 1879. He instituted the office of chancellor of the diocese and insisted on annual reports from clergy and parishes in order to bring the diocese out of great debt.

Death and legacy 
Elder died in Cincinnati on October 31, 1904, from influenza. He is buried at St. Joseph Cemetery in Cincinnati, Ohio.  Elder High School, a Cincinnati parochial school, was named for Elder.

See also
Archdiocese of Cincinnati

References

External links

Biography of William Henry Elder
St. Mary Basilica Archives, Natchez, Mississippi

Civil War diary (1862-1865) of Bishop William Henry Elder, Bishop of Natchez

Episcopal succession

1819 births
1904 deaths
19th-century Roman Catholic archbishops in the United States
20th-century Roman Catholic archbishops in the United States
Roman Catholic archbishops of Cincinnati
Deaths from influenza
Infectious disease deaths in Ohio
Religious leaders from Baltimore
People from Natchez, Mississippi
People of Mississippi in the American Civil War
Religious leaders from Cincinnati
Roman Catholic Diocese of Jackson
Catholics from Mississippi